Willis is a masculine given name which may refer to the following people:

Men
Willis Bouchey (1907–1977), American actor
Willis B. Burns (1851–1915), American businessman and politician
Willis Carrier (1876–1950), American engineer and inventor, best known for inventing modern air conditioning
Willis Carto (born 1926), American far right activist and Holocaust denier
Willis Conover (1920–1996), jazz producer and longtime broadcaster on the Voice of America
Willis Goldbeck (1898–1979), American screenwriter and film director
Willis Hall (1929–2005), English playwright and radio and television writer
Willis Harman (1918–1997), American engineer, social scientist, academic, futurist and writer
Willis Hudlin (1906–2002), Major League Baseball pitcher
Willis Jackson, Baron Jackson of Burnley (1904–1970), British technologist and electrical engineer
Willis Jackson (saxophonist) (1932–1987), American jazz tenor saxophonist
Willis Linn Jepson (1867–1946), American botanist
Willis Lamb (1913–2008), American physicist and Nobel laureate
Willis Augustus Lee (1888–1945), vice-admiral of the United States Navy and Olympic Games sport shooter
Willis McGahee (born 1981), National Football League running back
Willis O'Brien (1886–1962), Irish American pioneering motion picture special effects artist
Willis Peguese (born 1966), American football player
Willis Polk (1867–1924), American architect
Willis Reed (born 1942), American retired basketball player, coach and general manager
Willis H. Stephens (born 1925), American politician
Willis Stephens, Jr. (born 1955), American politician, son of the above
Willis Van Devanter (1859–1941), an Associate Justice of the United States Supreme Court
Willis Ward (1912-1983?), African-American track and field athlete and football player, lawyer and judge

Women
Willis Marie Van Schaack, birth name of Lili St. Cyr (1918–1999), American burlesque dancer and stripper